CMBC may refer to:
 Canadian Mennonite Bible College, one of three colleges that merged in 1990 to form Canadian Mennonite University
 Coast Mountain Bus Company, the main contract operator for bus transit services in Metro Vancouver, British Columbia, Canada 
 China Minsheng Bank, China Minsheng Banking Corporation Limited 中国民生银行股份有限公司